Douglas Bonar Pettigrew (December 16, 1917 – October 18, 1973) was a Canadian politician. He served in the Legislative Assembly of New Brunswick as member of the Progressive Conservative party from 1952 to 1960.

References

1917 births
1973 deaths
Progressive Conservative Party of New Brunswick MLAs